An ASMR Album is the debut studio album by American comedian, Brandon Wardell. The album was released on June 1, 2018.

Background 
The album was first announced on May 3, 2018, while the entire concept of the album originally was revealed to be an entire joke. Producer Ricky Reed said that him and Wardell started the process as a "dumb idea" which manifested into the album. Reed said, of the album, and its recording process that it turned "into a gonzo journey through his brain complete with a time traveling plot twist and interludes played by a tiny band that sounds like ants playing jazz on acid".

In an interview with Paste, Wardell was interested in doing an autonomous sensory meridian response (ASMR) album, strictly because of the originality of it. Wardell said that to his knowledge no musician or comedian has ever done an ASMR album before, so he wanted to be the first. Wardell further said of making the album "it’s not a good idea but no one’s done it before. It’s just me whispering my jokes mostly. Imagine me whispering and also I’m giving you a scalp massage while I say it."

Track listing

Critical reception 

In a mixed review, Larry Fitzmaurice of Pitchfork gave the album a 5.7/10. Fitzmaurice described the album as an "uneven listen, even for the most logged-on".

References

External links 
 An ASMR Album on Bandcamp

2018 debut albums
Brandon Wardell albums
Comedy albums by American artists
2010s comedy albums
2010s spoken word albums
Spoken word albums by American artists